is a city located in Tochigi Prefecture, Japan. , the city had an estimated population of 143,653, in 62,123 households and a population density of 810 persons per km².

Geography
Ashikaga is located in the northern Kanto plain in the far southwestern corner of Tochigi Prefecture, bordering on Gunma Prefecture to the north, west and south. The Watarase River flows through the center of the city.  It is located approximately 80 km north of Tokyo.

Surrounding municipalities
Tochigi Prefecture
 Sano
Gunma Prefecture
 Tatebayashi
 Kiryū
 Ōta
 Ōra

Climate
Ashikaga has a Humid continental climate (Köppen Cfa) characterized by warm summers.  The average annual temperature in Ashikaga is 14.2 °C. The average annual rainfall is 1280 mm with September as the wettest month. The temperatures are highest on average in August, at around 26.4 °C, and lowest in January, at around 2.9 °C.

Demographics
Per Japanese census data, the population of Ashikaga has declined over the past 30 years.

History

During the Heian Period, Ashikaga was developed by Minamoto no Yoshikuni, whose descendants later became the Ashikaga clan. The area was noted from this period for its academy, the Ashikaga Gakkō. During the Edo period, it was the center of Ashikaga Domain under the Tokugawa shogunate. Following the Meiji restoration, the town of Ashikaga within Ashikaga District, Tochigi was established with the creation of the modern municipalities system on April 1, 1889. It was elevated to city status on January 1, 1921. Ashikaga annexed the neighboring village of Keno on March 3, 1951 and the town of Yamabe on April 1, 1953. This was followed on August 1, 1954 by the villages of Mie and Yamamae, and on November 1, 1954 by the villages of Kitago and Nagusa. On April 1, 1959, Ashikaga annexed the village of Tomita, and the northern half of the village of Yabagawa on July 1, 1960.  On October 1, 1962, Ashikaga annexed the towns of Mikuriya and Sakanishi. Ashikaga District was dissolved by this final merger.

Government
Ashikaga has a mayor-council form of government with a directly elected mayor and a unicameral city legislature of 24 members. Ashikaga contributes four members to the Tochigi Prefectural Assembly. In terms of national politics, the city is part of Tochigi 5th district of the lower house of the Diet of Japan.

Economy
Ashikaga has long been noted for its textile industry, but in recent years, it has also become known as an industrial and commercial city producing various aluminum, machine metal works and products. In the agricultural sector, Ashikaga is noted for its tomatoes.

Education
Ashikaga Institute of Technology
Ashikaga Junior College
Ashikaga has 22 public primary schools and 11 public middle schools operated by the city government and five public high schools operated by the Tochigi Prefectural Board of Education. There are also three private high schools and one private middle school. The prefecture also operates two special education schools for the handicapped.

Transportation

Railway
 JR East – Ryōmō Line
 -  -  - 
 Tōbu Railway – Tobu Isesaki Line
  -  -  -  -

Highway
  – Ashikaga Interchange – Izuruhara Parking Area

Local attractions

Ashikaga Gakkō (足利学校): referred to as the oldest school in Japan.  
Ashikaga Flower Park (足利フラワーパーク): Japan's oldest and largest wisteria.
Orihime Shrine (織姫神社): This shrine was built in 1879, the guardians of the textile city, Ashikaga.
Banna-ji Temple (鑁阿寺): A temple known for its association with the Ashikaga clan.
Kurita Museum (栗田美術館): This museum has a fine collection of Imari and Nabeshima porcelains.
Watarase River Fireworks display, which takes places on the first Saturday of August attracts thousands of people from around the Kantō area.
Watarasebashi Monument: A stele erected near Watarase Bridge in 2007 in honor of Chisato Moritaka's 1993 song "Watarasebashi". The stele features a speaker that plays a portion of the song.
Coco Farm & Winery, located in the foothills on the outskirts of town. Founded around 1950, the vineyards are tended by adults with special needs and staff members living in community.  During the third weekend of November, a harvest festival is held with live music and wine tasting.  Thousands of visitors attend every year.

Sister city relations
 Springfield (Illinois), United States
 Jining, Shandong, China
 Kamakura, Japan

Noted people
Mitsuo Aida, poet and calligrapher
George Akiyama, manga artist
Masao Urino, songwriter, director
Yumiko Hara, marathon runner
Noriyo Tateno, professional wrestler
Atsushi Abe,  voice actor
Chiaki Ishii, Japanese Brazilian judoka
Toshimitsu Motegi, politician, member of parliament and Japanese government minister

See also 
 Asteroid 9887 Ashikaga, named after the city

References

External links

 Official Website 
 

 
Cities in Tochigi Prefecture